Zahedan (Balochi and) is a city and capital of Sistan and Baluchestan Province, Iran. At the 2016 census, its population was 587,730.

The city was the site of a deadly crackdown in October 2022, with dozens citizens killed by pro-governmental forces. Over 90 people were killed. Two senior police officials were fired in the aftermath of the crackdown. On 28 October, there were protests in Zahedan and security forces fired on protestors, killing 1 and injuring 14.

On 3 November 2022, the Shi'i cleric and Khamenei loyalist Sajjad Shahraki was assassinated in Zahedan. The next day, there were widespread protests in the city and Revolutionary Guards and other armed forces fired on protestors.

Name
The original name of the city was Duzzap (Persian: Duzdab, meaning "Water Stolen"), which it had received due to the abrupt floods into the valley. The name was later changed to Zahedan (Persian for "hermits") during Reza Shah's visit in 1929.

History 

Mention of Zahedan first appears in sources in August 1849. However, the city first truly started to grow during the early 20th-century. During World War I it became the westernmost terminal of the Zahedan railway station, which reached as far as Quetta in the northern part of what was then British Baluchistan.

Geography

Zahedan is connected by rail to nearby Pakistan and is near to Afghanistan.

Climate
Zahedan has a hot desert climate (Köppen climate classification BWh) with hot summers and cool winters. Precipitation is very low, and mostly falls in winter.

Demographics 
Although the surrounding area has many ancient sites, Zahedan itself developed mainly in the 20th century. Before being chosen as the provincial administrative center in the 1930s, Zahedan was a small village. Its population reached 17,500 by 1956 and increased more than fivefold to 93,000 by 1976. After 1980, large numbers of refugees fleeing the Soviet invasion of Afghanistan helped triple the population of Zahedan to more than 281,000 by 1986, a number which has since doubled again.

Education 

Zahedan is the home of the Islamic Azad University of Zahedan, the Zahedan University of Medical Sciences
and the University of Sistan and Baluchestan.
Besides, the largest Sunni seminary, Darululoom Zahedan, is located in Zahedan. There are some other religious Sunni schools in the city and the vicinity.

Sports

In April 2008 the 70 billion IRR (about 2.5 million USD) Zahedan Stadium was built with a seating capacity of 15,000 people. It was inaugurated on 18 April 2008 with a friendly football game between Honarmandan (Artists) and a local team.

Economy

Zahedan is the main economic center of the region and home to many small- and medium-scale industries. Its main products include cotton textiles, woven and hand-knotted rugs, ceramics, processed foods, livestock feed, processed hides, milled rice, brick, reed mats and baskets.

Transport 

Zahedan is served by Zahedan International Airport.

Highway 95 links Zahedan to Tehran and Mashhad in the north and the port of Bandar Chabahar on the Sea of Oman in the south, and Highway 84 to the Pakistani city of Quetta in the east and to Kerman in the west.

For decades the  broad gauge (Indian subcontinent system) railway exists from Zahedan station to/from Quetta's station in Pakistan, the Quetta–Taftan Railway Line. Beyond this, west, a standard gauge line was completed from Zahedan to Kerman linking the city with the rest of the Iranian rail network. This flowed from a 18 May 2007 MOU for rail co-operation (of Pakistan and Iran) under which the line was to be completed by December 2008. It was completed with an opening ceremony on 19 June 2009. This means that Zahedan hosts the break of gauge between the Islamic Republic of Iran Railway's standard gauge tracks of the Trans-Iranian Railway and Pakistan Railway's broad gauge aforementioned.

Chabahar–Zahedan railway 

In May 2016, during Indian Prime Minister Narendra Modi's trip to Iran, agreement was signed to develop two terminals and five berths at Port of Chabahar and to build a new railway between Chabahar and Zahedan, as part of North–South Transport Corridor, by Indian Railways's public sector unit Ircon International. This proposal is under study and consideration, a via Kerman connection to the port of Chabahar.

In July 2016, India began shipping US$150 million of tracks to Chabahar to build the US$1.6 billion line, for which India pledged additional US$400 million and Iran has also allocated US$125 million in December 2016, thus taking the total allocation to US$575 million (out of US$1.6 billion needed) by the end of 2016.

Notable people
Mohammad Jorjandi, cybercrime expert

See also 

 2007 Zahedan bombings
 2009 Zahedan bombings
 July 2010 Zahedan bombings
 2019 Khash–Zahedan suicide bombing

Notes

References

Sources

External links 
 
 Municipality of Zahedan
 Zahedan University of Medical Sciences
 Official Website of the Sunni Community of Iran, Sunnionline

 
Populated places in Zahedan County
Cities in Sistan and Baluchestan Province
Iranian provincial capitals